Blossac may refer to:

People
Bernard Blossac (1917-2002), French fashion illustrator.

Locations
Blossac Park, a historic garden and park in Poitiers, France.
Hôtel de Blossac, a historic building in Rennes, France.